Xingsha Subdistrict is a subdistrict and the county seat of Changsha County in Hunan Province, China. It was reformed in September 2009. The subdistrict is divided into 17 communities.

References 

Divisions of Changsha County
Changsha County
County seats in Hunan